The Fashion Institute of Technology (FIT) is a public college in New York City. It is part of the State University of New York (SUNY) and focuses on art, business, design, mass communication, and technology connected to the fashion industry. It was founded in 1944.

Academics

Seventeen majors are offered through the School of Art and Design, and ten through the Jay and Patty Baker School of Business and Technology leading to an A.A.S., B.F.A., or B.S. The School of Liberal Arts offers a B.S. in art history and museum professions and a B.S. in film and media. The School of Graduate Studies offers seven programs leading to a Master of Arts, Master of Fine Arts, or Master of Professional Studies.

In addition to the degree programs, FIT offers a wide selection of non-credit courses through the Center for Professional Studies. One of the most popular programs is the "Sew Like a Pro" series, which teaches basic through advanced sewing skills.

FIT is an accredited institutional member of the Middle States Association of Colleges and Schools, the National Association of Schools of Art and Design, and the Council for Interior Design Accreditation. FIT publishes research on store branding and store positioning.  In 1967, FIT faculty and staff won the first higher education union contract in New York State.

Campus
The nine-building campus in the Midtown South neighborhood of Manhattan includes classrooms, television and radio studios, labs, design workshops, and multiple exhibition galleries.

The Conference Center at FIT features the John E. Reeves Great Hall, a space suitable for conferences, fashion shows, lectures, and other events.  The campus also has two large theaters: the Haft Auditorium and the Katie Murphy Amphitheatre.

FIT serves more than 7,578 full-time and 2,186 part-time students. Four dormitories, three of which are on campus, serve approximately 2,300 students and offer a variety of accommodations. The George S. and Mariana Kaufman Residence Hall located at 406 West 31st Street—formerly a book bindery factory—was converted into residential apartments, to offer more housing near the campus for FIT students. The campus also has a retail food court/dining hall, a deli and a Starbucks.

Academic facilities 

The Fred P. Pomerantz Art and Design Center offers facilities for design studies: photography studios with black-and-white darkrooms, painting rooms, a sculpture studio, a printmaking room, a graphics laboratory, display and exhibit design rooms, life-sketching rooms, and a model-making workshop. The Shirley Goodman Resource Center houses the Museum at FIT and the Library/Media Services, with references for history, sociology, technology, art, and literature; international journals and periodicals; sketchbooks and records donated by designers, manufacturers, and merchants; slides, tapes, and periodicals; and a clipping file. The Gladys Marcus Library provides access to books, periodicals, DVDs and non-print materials, and houses Fashion Institute of Technology Special Collections and College Archives. FIT also has many computer labs for student use. The Instructional Media Services Department provides audiovisual and TV support and an in-house TV studio. Student work is also displayed throughout the campus. Fashion shows featuring the work of graduating B.F.A. students occur each academic year.

The Design/Research Lighting Laboratory, a development facility for interior design and other academic disciplines, features 400 commercially available lighting fixtures controlled by a computer. The Annette Green/Fragrance Foundation Laboratory is an environment for the study of fragrance development.

Alumni 

Well-known alumni of the school include the fashion designers Norma Kamali, Calvin Klein, Michael Kors (who did not complete his studies there), interior designer Scott Salvator, and film director Joel Schumacher.

The Museum at FIT 

The Museum at FIT, founded in 1969 as the Design Laboratory, includes collections of clothing, textiles, and accessories.

It began presenting exhibitions in the 1970s, utilizing a collection on long-term loan from the Brooklyn Museum of Art, and then over time acquiring its own collection as well as thousands of textiles and other fashion-related material. In 1993, the Board of Trustees of FIT, noting the significance of the Design Laboratory's collections and exhibitions, changed the institution's name to The Museum at FIT. In 2012, the museum was awarded accreditation by the American Alliance of Museums.

The museum's permanent collection now includes more than 50,000 garments and accessories from the 18th century to the present.  Important designers such as Adrian, Balenciaga, Chanel, and Dior are represented. The collecting policy of the museum focuses on aesthetically and historically significant clothing, accessories, textiles and visual materials, with emphasis on contemporary avant-garde fashion.

There are three galleries in the museum. The lower level gallery is devoted to special exhibitions. The Fashion and Textile   History Gallery on the main floor features a rotating selection of approximately 200 historically and artistically significant objects from the museum's permanent collection. Gallery FIT, also located on the main floor, is dedicated to student and faculty exhibitions.

Past exhibitions include: London Fashion, which received the first Richard Martin Award for Excellence in Costume Exhibitions from The Costume Society of America, The Corset: Fashioning the Body, and Gothic: Dark Glamour. Other special exhibitions have included Isabel Toledo: Fashion From the Inside Out, in which the inauguration day ensemble Isabel Toledo designed for Michelle Obama in 2008 was on display, and a look at sustainable fashion with Eco-Fashion: Going Green, an exhibition from 2010 examining the past two centuries of fashion's good—and bad—environmental and ethical practices.

More than 100,000 people visit the Museum at FIT each year, attending exhibitions, lectures, and other events. Admission is free to the public.

Fashion historian Valerie Steele became director of the Museum in 2003, and has also been named chief curator.

References

External links

 
1944 establishments in New York City
Art schools in New York City
Chelsea, Manhattan
Educational institutions established in 1944
Fashion schools in the United States
Midtown Manhattan
NJCAA athletics
Seventh Avenue (Manhattan)
SUNY community colleges
Universities and colleges in Manhattan
Universities and colleges in New York City